Sergio Bustamante (October 18, 1934 – May 22, 2014) was a Mexican actor of telenovelas, cinema, dubbing and theater.

Life and career
Born Sergio Emilio Edgardo de Bustamante y Arteaga Roa, he studied psychology in UNAM and later acted in Escuela de Arte Teatral. His debut as an actor was in El duelo by Federico S. Inclán. His debut in cinema was Una golfa in 1957 with Silvia Pinal.

With Los Spyders, he recorded "La fiesta magna", and he was a member of Sergio & Los Lunáticos. Bustamante also worked with Los Teen Tops.

He died in Puebla, Mexico on May 22, 2014 from a heart attack at the age of 79.

Filmography

Film

 Ama a tu prójimo (1958) .... Ángel Martinelli / Soto
 Una golfa (1958) .... Luis
 Lágrimas de amor (1959)
 Vuelta al paraíso (1960) .... Doroteo
 Siguiendo pistas (1960)
 La tórtola del Ajusco (1962)
 El tejedor de milagros (1962) .... Teófilo
 La sombra de los hijos (1964) .... Mario
 Un hombre en la trampa (1965) .... Esposo de Cristina
 La recta final (1966) .... Gato
 Valentín Armienta el vengador (1969)
 Todo por nada (1969) .... Johnny
 El principio (1973) .... Don Pancho
 En busca de un muro (1974) .... Narrador
 La odisea de los muñecos (1975) .... (voice)
 Un mulato llamado Martín (1975)
 Espejismo de la ciudad (1976) .... Lorenzo Rojas
 El caballito volador (1982) .... Don Abusivo
 Mercenarios de la muerte (1983) .... Kan Jen Mercenario
 Las glorias del gran Púas (1984)
 El rey de oros (1984) .... Don Marcos
 Mientras México duerme (1986) .... Gil
 Veneno para las hadas (1986) .... Flavia's Father (voice)
 Robachicos (1986)
 Su destino era matar (1988)
 Ratas de vecindad (1988)
 Durazo, la verdadera historia (1988)
 Santa sangre (1989) .... Monseñor
 Jóvenes delincuentes (1989)
 Fiesta de sangre (1989)
 Bonampak (1989)
 Orgía de terror (1990)
 Los demonios del desierto (1990)
 La tómbola de la muerte (1990)
 La mujer judicial (1990)
 Justiciero callejero (1990)
 Agua roja (1990)
 One Man's War (1991, TV Movie) .... Gomes
 Perseguida (1991) .... Hermenegildo Parra
 Secreto sangriento (1991) .... Don Rodolfo
 Descendiente de asesinos (1991) .... José Guzmán
 Playa azul (1992) .... Ingeniero
 Perros de presa (1992)
 Vampiro, guerrero de la noche (1993)
 Bosque de muerte (1993) .... Padre de Silvia
 Memoria del cine mexicano (1993) .... Él mismo
 Sin retorno (1995)
 Dioses del México antiguo (1996) .... Narrador
 Pamela por amor (2008)
 El mar muerto (2009) .... Cura
 Mi vida por ti (2009)
 Catarsis (2010, Short) .... El Padre
 Acapulco La vida va (2017) .... Justo (final film role)

Telenovelas
TV Azteca
 La calle de las novias (1999) .... Luis Cardozo
 Cuando seas mía (2001) .... Juan Francisco Sánchez Zambrano
 La duda (2002) .... Adolfo
 La heredera (2004)
 Alma legal (2008) .... Manuel
 Noche eterna (2008) .... Don Sebastián
 Quiéreme (2010) .... Victorio Dorelli
 Emperatriz (2011) .... Justo del Real (Main Villain, father of Emperatriz) A corazón abierto (2012) .... Silvestre Ramírez (Special appearance in episode 107)

Televisa
 Espejo de sombras (1960)
 Cartas de amor (1960)
 Las momias de Guanajuato (1962)
 Lo prohibido (1967)
 Detrás del muro (1967)
 Las víctimas (1967)
 Incertidumbre (1967)
 Aurelia (1968)
 Fallaste corazón (1968) .... Alfonso
 Rosario (1969)
 Cadenas de angustia (1969)
 La gata (1970) .... Mariano Martínez Negrete
 Cosa juzgada (1970)
 La constitución (1970)
 Aquí está Felipe Reyes (1972)
 Los miserables (1974) .... Jean Valjean
 Mundos opuestos (1976)
 Los bandidos del río frío (1976) .... Relumbrón
 Un original y veinte copias (1978) .... Legorreta
 El amor llegó más tarde (1979)
 Infamia (1981) .... David Montalvo
 Cenizas y diamantes (1990) .... Dámaso Gallardo
 Buscando el paraíso (1993) .... Marcelo
 Agujetas de color de rosa (1994) .... Gino
 La antorcha encendida (1996) .... Virrey José de Iturrigaray

TV series

 I Dream of Jeannie (Latin American dub) (1965- 1970) .... Roger Healey
 De par en par (1986)
 Hora marcada (1986)
 Visión real (1998) .... Presentador-Narrador
 Historias de ellos para ellas (2003)
 Ni una vez más (2006) .... Dante Villaseñor
 La niñera (2007) .... Billy Corcuera

Theater
 El cántaro roto Los gallos salvajes Tamara Anita la huerfanita Los chicos de la banda Israfel Un sombrero de paja de Italia La vida es sueño El alquimista Muchacha de campo Calígula Los intereses creados''

References

External links

1934 births
2014 deaths
Mexican male film actors
Mexican male telenovela actors
Male actors from Mexico City
National Autonomous University of Mexico alumni
Mexican male stage actors
20th-century Mexican male actors
21st-century Mexican male actors
Ariel Award winners